Pounced is a Breeders' Cup Juvenile Turf-winning thoroughbred racehorse owned by Lady Rothschild. He was retired to stud in 2010.

He is a son of Rahy who stands in Kentucky and the Storm Cat mare Golden Cat.

On November 7, 2009 at Santa Anita Park, Pounced stalked the front-running Bridgetown for much of the race before blowing past the Florida-bred Summer Stakes winner in the closing.

References
 http://www.google.com.cu/search?hl=es&q=Pounced+is+by+Rahy+out+of&meta=&aq=o&oq=
 http://www.google.com.cu/search?hl=es&q=Pounced+dam+is&meta=&aq=f&oq=

2007 racehorse births
Breeders' Cup Juvenile Turf winners
Thoroughbred family 8-c
Racehorses bred in Kentucky
Racehorses trained in the United Kingdom